Paolo Grossi may refer to

Paolo Grossi (judge) (1933–2022), Italian judge
Paolo Grossi (footballer) (born 1981), Italian football player